These are the Billboard magazine number-one pop albums of 1968.

Chart history

See also
1968 in music

References

1968
United States albums